Rani Sharone (born 1978) is the bassist/guitarist for the band Stolen Babies. He is the twin brother of drummer Gil Sharone.

In 2010, Sharone and actor Bill Moseley formed the duo Spider Mountain, and released their self titled album. Their song "Lord, Let Me Help You Decide Who to Kill" is included in the 2001 Maniacs: Field of Screams soundtrack. 

In 2016, Sharone wrote the music for the film My Entire High School Sinking into the Sea.

References

Living people
American heavy metal bass guitarists
American male bass guitarists
1978 births
21st-century American bass guitarists
21st-century American male musicians
American twins